Mihail Zahariev (born 12 December 1972) is a Bulgarian former professional footballer who is currently youth coach at Levski Sofia.

Career

A natural defender, Zahariev is mainly known for his time with Slavia Sofia and has also represented Levski Sofia. He was champion of Bulgaria and in addition to that won a Bulgarian Cup with Slavia Sofia. In 2013, Zahariev was among the footballers who received an honorary medal as part of the commemorations that marked a century since the founding of the "whites".

References

1972 births
Living people
Bulgarian footballers
Association football defenders
PFC Levski Sofia players
PFC Slavia Sofia players
First Professional Football League (Bulgaria) players